Fimbristylis helicophylla, commonly known as twisted leaf fimbristylis, is a sedge of the family Cyperaceae that is native a small area in the Kimberley region of Western Australia.

References

Plants described in 2015
Flora of Western Australia
helicophylla
Taxa named by Barbara Lynette Rye
Taxa named by Russell Lindsay Barrett
Taxa named by Matthew David Barrett